Federal elections were held in Switzerland on 25 October 1914. The Free Democratic Party retained its majority in the National Council.

Electoral system
The 189 members of the National Council were elected in 49 single- and multi-member constituencies using a three-round system. Candidates had to receive a majority in the first or second round to be elected; if it went to a third round, only a plurality was required. Voters could cast as many votes as there were seats in their constituency. There was one seat for every 20,000 citizens, with seats allocated to cantons in proportion to their population.

Results

National Council 
Voter turnout was highest in Aargau at 85.9% (higher than the 78.7% in Schaffhausen where voting was compulsory) and lowest in Zug at 21.2%.

By constituency

Council of States

By canton

References

1914
Switzerland
1914 in Switzerland
October 1914 events
Federal